The Bank of America Plaza is a skyscraper in San Antonio, Texas, USA. It opened in 1984 as Interfirst Bank Plaza, was designed by the Houston office of Skidmore, Owings and Merrill and is 28 stories high.

It is the largest office building in the city with 533,171 feet of office space. It is also the city's 6th tallest building.

In 2016 a piece of art called Kinetic Skyline was installed on the side of Bank of America Plaza. USAA purchased the building in downtown San Antonio on August 14, 2017, but ended its deal to move 2,000 employees into downtown offices with the City of San Antonio and Bexar County in spring of 2022.

In popular culture
The building was used for establishing shots in the opening credits and in episodes for the offices of the title character in the short lived NBC television series "J.J. Starbuck."

See also
List of tallest buildings in San Antonio

References

Bank of America buildings
Skyscraper office buildings in San Antonio
Economy of San Antonio
Office buildings completed in 1984

Skidmore, Owings & Merrill buildings